Liu Shi or Liushi may refer to:

People
Emperor Yuan of Han (75–33 BC), given name Liu Shi, emperor of the Han dynasty
Liu Shi (Tang dynasty) (died 659), grand councilor of the Tang dynasty
Liu Rushi or Liu Shi (1618–1664), Ming dynasty courtesan and poet
Liu Shi (politician), discipline inspector for the Communist Party of China

Places in China
Liushi Shan, mountain in the Kunlun Mountain Range, between Tibet and Xinjiang in western China
Liushi Township (六市乡), a township in Lianhua County, Jiangxi
Liushi Subdistrict, Liuzhou (柳石街道), a subdistrict of Liunan District, Liuzhou, Guangxi
Liushi Subdistrict, Dongyang (六石街道), a subdistrict of Dongyang, Zhejiang

Towns
Liushi, Hebei (留史), in Li County, Hebei
Liushi, Hunan (硫市), in Hengnan County, Hunan
Liushi, Yueqing (柳市), in Yueqing, Zhejiang

Others
Lapse of Time, a 1982 Chinese novella by Wang Anyi

See also
Lady Liu (disambiguation), notable women surnamed Liu in ancient and imperial China
Liu Zhi (ROC) (1892–1971), Chinese Kuomintang general and politician, sometimes romanized as "Liu Shi"